Golagam is a village in  Anakapalli  district of the Indian state of Andhra Pradesh. It is located in gurla Mandal of gurla . It is located at a distance of 1 km from gurla and at a distance of 1 km from vizayanagaram.

Demographics 

 Census of India, Golagam had a population of 3082. The total population constitute, 1547 males and 1535 females with a sex ratio of 992 females per 1000 males. 346 children are in the age group of 0–6 years, with child sex ratio of 891 girls per 1000 boys. The average literacy rate stands at 58.74%.

Transport 

APSRTC runs buses from Anakapalle and Visakhapatnam to Golagam. Thadi and Anakapalle railway stations serve the village.

References

Villages in Anakapalli  district